Chandel district (Meitei pronunciation:/ˌtʃænˈdɛl/) is one of the 16 districts of Manipur state in northeastern India.

As of 2011 it was the second least populous district in the state, after Tamenglong. In December 2016, a part of the district was split to establish the new Tengnoupal district.

History 

In 1974, the Chandel district was formed under the name "Tengnoupal district". In 1983, the name was changed to Chandel district, as the district headquarters were located at Chandel. In December 2016, the present-day Tengnoupal district was split from the Chandel district.

Economy
In 2006 the Ministry of Panchayati Raj named Chandel as one of the country's 250 most backward districts (out of a total of 640). It was then one of the three districts in Manipur receiving funds from the Backward Regions Grant Fund Programme (BRGF).

Demographics
According to the 2011 census Chandel district has a population of 85,072. This gives it a ranking of 602nd in India (out of a total of 640). Its population growth rate over the decade 2001–2011 was 21.72%. Chandel has a sex ratio of 932 females for every 1000 males, and a literacy rate of 70.85%.

Languages
Languages spoken include Pakan, Thadou, Vaiphei, Zou, Lamkang and Meitei. In addition there is Aimol, a Sino-Tibetan tongue with fewer than 2500 speakers, written in the Latin script; and Anal, which is also Sino-Tibetan and spoken by approximately 14,000 Indians.

Flora and fauna

Autonomous district council
At the district level there is the Chandel Autonomous District Council.

See also 
 List of populated places in Chandel district

Notes

References

External links
 Official government website

 
Districts of Manipur
Minority Concentrated Districts in India
1974 establishments in Manipur